Crocus antalyensis  is a species of flowering plant in the genus Crocus of the family Iridaceae. It is a cormous perennial native to Turkey.

The species grows evergreen oak scrub around 1000 meters in altitude: flowering occurs in early spring.

There are three subspecies:
 Crocus antalyensis subsp. antalyensis
 Crocus antalyensis subsp. gemicii Sik & Erol
 Crocus antalyensis subsp. striatus Erol & Kocyigit

References

antalyensis
Flora of Turkey
Plants described in 1972